"Pinecrest", also known as the Richard C. Kerens House and Kerens-Spears House, is a historic home located at Elkins, Randolph County, West Virginia.  It was built in 1892, as a summer home for Richard C. Kerens (1842 – 1916).  It is a large sandstone dwelling in a modified Shingle Style. It has an asymmetrical shape with gable-fronted sections in the main portion, a hip roof on the servants wing, and two cone-shaped tops on rounded turrets.  It features a front porch that extends well beyond the exterior wall and curves along a single-story rounded projection at the east corner.

It was listed on the National Register of Historic Places in 1979.

References

Houses on the National Register of Historic Places in West Virginia
Italianate architecture in West Virginia
Houses completed in 1892
Houses in Randolph County, West Virginia
National Register of Historic Places in Randolph County, West Virginia
Shingle Style architecture in West Virginia